Jonathan Law (August 6, 1674 – November 6, 1750) was the 27th Governor of the Colony of Connecticut, serving in that office from 1741 to 1750.

Biography
Law was born in Milford in what was then Connecticut Colony to Jonathan and Sarah (Clark) Law. He studied law at Harvard College. Known as talented, amiable, and even-tempered, he graduated in 1695. He married five times and had a number of children, seven of whom were sons. On December 20, 1698, he married Anne Eliot; on February 14, 1704, Abigail Arnold; on August 1, 1706, Abigail Andrew; in 1725, widow Sarah Burr; and in 1730, Eunice (Hall) Andrew. Some of his children and grandchildren went on to serve in Congress and other national political offices.

Career
In 1698, Law established a law office in Milford. A Justice of the Peace and of the Quorum for New Haven County in May 1709, he was then named Judge of the County Court of New Haven County and Assistant Judge of the Connecticut Superior Court.

Elected Deputy to the Connecticut General Assembly in 1706, Law served several terms until 1717. He was then chosen an assistant and served as such, with the exception of one year, until 1724. In October 1724, he became Deputy Governor and, in May 1725, Chief Judge of the Superior Court, holding these two offices at the same time, which was possible under the government of that era.

By the time that Law came to the governorship in October 1741, following the death of Governor Joseph Talcott, Law was 67 years old and had been active in the colonial government for 35 years. He had an extensive farm and was one of the first to plant mulberry trees and introduce raising silk worms to Connecticut. He advocated the industry and advertised by wearing a coat and stockings made of Connecticut silk at a public appearance in 1747.

Death and legacy
Law died while in office on November 6, 1750 in Milford, Connecticut, and is interred at Milford Cemetery.  Jonathan Law High School in Milford Connecticut was named in his honor.

References

External links
 
Connecticut State Library: Jonathan Law
Hume Family Home Page: Family Tree: Jonathan Law

1674 births
1750 deaths
Harvard College alumni
People of colonial Connecticut
Colonial governors of Connecticut
Members of the Connecticut General Assembly Council of Assistants (1662–1818)
Members of the Connecticut House of Representatives
Burials in Connecticut